Abraham ("Bram") Robertus Lomans (born 19 April 1975 in Roosendaal) is a former Dutch field hockey player, who twice won the gold medal at the Olympics: in Atlanta (1996 and in Sydney (2000).

He made his debut for the Dutch side on 16 June 1995 in a friendly match against Ireland. Since then the defender has played 201 international matches for Holland, in which he scored 140 goals. Lomans was famous for his penalty corners. He is one of the precursors of the drag flick technique that appeared in the 1990s.

Just before the 2004 Summer Olympics in Athens, he was removed from the team by coach Terry Walsh. Lomans played in the Dutch League for Push and HGC, and stopped at top level in the spring of 2005. He made a comeback for the 2006–07 season in the Dutch League and scored more than 20 goals once again. He was renamed in the national team in June 2007.

In 2014, Lomans, now living in Singapore, reignited his career with the Singapore Dutch, and helped the side seal gold with a 5–0 victory over Hong Kong in the final of the ZOAT at HKFC's Sports Road ground.

Following the disappointment of the 2015 ZOAT, in which the Singapore Dutch finished 9th in Bangkok despite only conceding one goal the entire tournament, Lomans was determined to make amends at the annual 2016 SCC sixes tournament at The Padang. The Dutch came close to a place in the finals but eventually fell to local rivals SRC in the semi-finals, 2–0. As a small measure of consolation, Lomans was named player of the tournament, beating out team-mate Paul Rombeek, who lost out on points for his raucous behaviour on the dance floor.

External links
 
 Dutch Hockey Federation

1975 births
Living people
Dutch male field hockey players
Male field hockey defenders
Dutch field hockey coaches
Field hockey players at the 1996 Summer Olympics
1998 Men's Hockey World Cup players
Field hockey players at the 2000 Summer Olympics
2002 Men's Hockey World Cup players
Olympic field hockey players of the Netherlands
Olympic gold medalists for the Netherlands
Sportspeople from Roosendaal
Olympic medalists in field hockey
Medalists at the 2000 Summer Olympics
Medalists at the 1996 Summer Olympics
HGC players
20th-century Dutch people
21st-century Dutch people